Veronika Velez-Zuzulová ( Zuzulová; born 15 July 1984) is a retired Slovak alpine ski racer. Born in Bratislava, she specialised in the slalom and was the most successful Slovak alpine skier before Petra Vlhová. She was coached by her father Timotej Zuzula and Vladimír Kovár. In April 2012, she married coach Romain Velez and added her maiden name to her married name becoming Velez-Zuzulová.

Velez-Zuzulová started skiing at age 3; at 14 she won the Trofeo Topolino in Italy, an unofficial children's world championship.

Europa Cup
She started competing in the Europa Cup from the 2000/2001 season, and she took Europa Cup race wins on 21 December 2003, 23 February 2004 and 19 December 2006, and 3rd place on 6 and 22 February 2004.

World Championships
At the 2007 World Championships in Åre, Sweden, she scored 9th place in super combined, 13th place in slalom and 21st place in giant slalom.

Velez-Zuzulová was part of the Slovakian team which took a surprise silver in the team event at the 2017 World Championships in St. Moritz, defeating Germany, Italy and Switzerland before being beaten by France in the final on time by eight hundredths of a second after a 2-2 tie.

World Cup
Velez-Zuzulová made her World Cup debut in a giant slalom at Sölden, Austria, on 28 October 2000. In November 2002, she started competing in slalom. Her first major win was in 2002 when she became the World Junior Champion. Her first run in super combined was in 2006.

Across her career, Velez-Zuzulová took 30 World Cup podiums with five victories, all in slalom (or parallel slalom). Her best results in the World Cup season standings came in the 2016 and 2017 seasons, when she finished second in the slalom discipline. In the 2013 season, she finished third in slalom and 12th overall; she also finished third in slalom in 2008. She retired from competition in 2018, with her final World Cup start being in a slalom in Ofterschwang.

Season results

Standings through 4 February 2018

Race podiums
 5 wins – (4 SL, 1 CE) 
 30 podiums – (27 SL, 3 CE)

World Championship results

Olympic results

References

External links

 
 
 
 
 
  

1984 births
Living people
Slovak female alpine skiers
Alpine skiers at the 2002 Winter Olympics
Alpine skiers at the 2006 Winter Olympics
Alpine skiers at the 2010 Winter Olympics
Alpine skiers at the 2018 Winter Olympics
Olympic alpine skiers of Slovakia
Sportspeople from Bratislava
Francophone people